Bishop Ćiril Kos (19 November 1919 – 6 July 2003) was a Croatian Roman Catholic prelate who served as the Diocesan Bishop of Đakovo or Bosna and Srijem since 6 February 1974 until his retirement on 6 February 1997. He also was a political prisoner in the former communist Yugoslavia during 1959–1962.

Life
Bishop Kos was born into a Croatian Roman Catholic family of Josip and Marija (née Fadiga) in the present-day Varaždin County, but in childhood transferred with own parents and grew-up in Harkanovci.

After graduation of the school education in Široki Brijeg, Bosnia and Herzegovina, he consequently joined the Major Theological Seminary in Đakovo, and was ordained as priest on July 9, 1944 for the Diocese of Bosna, Đakovo and Srijem, after completed his philosophical and theological studies.

From August 1944 until the end of October of the same year, he served as chaplain in Srijemska Mitrovica. In short, due to the circumstances of the war, he also served as the administrator of the same parish. From 1946 to 1951 he was the parish priest in Trnjani near Garčin. From 1951 to 1959 he was a spiritual director at the his alma mater – Theological Seminary in Đakovo. Here Fr. Kos was arrested and sentenced by the communist authorities to 7 years in prison. He served his sentence in Osijek and Stara Gradiška from October 5, 1959 to April 5, 1962. From 1962 to 1973 he served as secretary of the Episcopal Ordinariate in Đakovo. From 1973 to 1974 he was a capitular vicar.

On February 6, 1974, he was appointed by Pope Paul VI as the Diocesan Bishop of the Diocese of Đakovo or Bosna and Srijem. On March 17, 1974, he was consecrated as bishop by Archbishop Mario Cagna and other prelates of the Roman Catholic Church in the Cathedral of St. Peter and St. Paul in Đakovo.

Retired on February 6, 1997, after reached age limit of 75 years old, and was successed by his Coadjutor Bishop. He died at the clinical hospital in Osijek on July 6, 2003, and was buried in the tomb of the Bishops of Đakovo and Srijem in the crypt of the cathedral-basilica in Đakovo two days later.

References

Further reading
 

1919 births
2003 deaths
People from Varaždin County
Prisoners and detainees of Yugoslavia
20th-century Roman Catholic bishops in Croatia
21st-century Roman Catholic bishops in Croatia
Roman Catholic bishops in Yugoslavia
Bishops appointed by Pope Paul VI